RBNS Sabha (90) is an Oliver Hazard Perry-class frigate in service with the Royal Bahrain Naval Force. The ship was former United States Navy frigate USS Jack Williams (FFG-24). The frigate is now considered as the lead frigate of the Royal Bahrain Naval Force.

Construction and career 

During its career as USS Jack Williams (FFG-24) in the United States, it was the sixteenth ship of the Oliver Hazard Perry class of guided-missile frigates. It was named for Pharmacist's Mate Second Class Jack Williams, who was posthumously awarded the Medal of Honor for his heroism in the Battle of Iwo Jima.

The frigate was ordered from Bath Iron Works on 28 February 1977 as part of the FY77 Program. Jack Williams was laid down on 25 February 1980; launched on 30 August 1980 and commissioned on 19 September 1981. Decommissioned and stricken on 13 September 1996, she was transferred to Bahrain the same day as a gift. 

The ship was formally recommissioned as the RBNS Sabha (90) on 25 February 1997. The frigate was named after a sea fort in Zubarah (located in today Qatar), historically belonged to Al Khalifa royal family of Bahrain. Sabha arrived in the Persian Gulf in June 1997 for a workup and crew training.

Sabha participated in Saudi-led Operation Restoring Hope in Yemen, returning to Bahraini waters in December 2015.

References

See also 
 Bahrain Defense Force

External links 

 USS Jack Williams

Oliver Hazard Perry-class frigates of the Bahraini Navy